Marc-Kevin Goellner was the defending champion, but did not compete this year.

Alberto Berasategui won the title by defeating Jim Courier 6–4, 6–2 in the final.

Seeds

Draw

Finals

Top half

Bottom half

References

External links
 Official results archive (ATP)
 Official results archive (ITF)

Nice